Big Picture (Hangul: 빅픽처), is a South Korean Web television program on Naver hosted by Kim Jong-kook and Haha along with Kim Kap Jin (Kim Jong-kook's manager) acting as an audience on the show. It is aired every Monday through Wednesday and Friday at 6.00pm KST  on Naver and V Live.

Season 1 
There are a total of 105 episode for Season 1 which runs from 4 May 2017 to 13 December 2017. Episodes 1 to 63 are on their MADE show, which acts as a temporary replacement for Big Picture. Starting from episodes 64, the Big Picture episodes are revealed, with the Big Picture being Lee Kwang-soo.

Season 2 
Season 2 runs from 5 March 2018 to June 6, 2018 with a total of 93 episodes. On Season 2 of Big Picture, they wanted to make a blockbuster movie, however, they do not have much budget to start with. Therefore, they started the MADE show once again.

Episode 1 to episode 91 are their MADE Show where Kim Jong Kook and Haha will introduce the different investors from the various companies who choose to invest on Big Picture. Various guests are also being featured in the show. Along with 2 other bonus episodes, (episode 92 and episode 93) were clips that was not aired previously on episode 1 to 91.

Special season 
This is a special season of Big Picture, which is known as 'Big Picture in Vietnam'. In this season, Kim Jong Kook and Haha heads to Vietnam for their PPL with Park Kwang joining them as their investor. This season runs from October 8, 2018 to December 7, 2018, with a total of 56 episodes and 8 special videos.

Season 3 
Season 3 will be released starting from April 8, 2019. Haha and Kim Jong Kook will continue to work on the K-drama plan and "Made Show" from the previous two seasons. There will be a total of 56 episodes in this season.

List of Episodes

Season 1

Season 2

Special season

Season 3

References

External links 

 Official Facebook
 V Live
 Official YouTube

South Korean web series
2017 web series debuts
Naver TV original programming